Roosevelt Road is a north–south avenue and part of Provincial Highway 9 in Taipei, Taiwan, connecting Zhongzheng District, Daan District and Wenshan District with Xindian District, New Taipei City in the south of the Taipei metropolitan area. It was named after U.S. President Franklin D. Roosevelt, making it the only street named for a Western figure in Taipei, excluding the former MacArthur Thruway. The road was built along the route of the old TRA Hsintien line, which closed in 1965.

Transport

Roosevelt Road passes through a number of commercial districts, schools, and government offices. It is the major access road to downtown Taipei from southern suburbs like Xindian and Jingmei, with heavy traffic at peak hour.

Roosevelt Road is now served by Taipei metro Xindian Line. On the street level, two bus lanes are laid in the middle of the road.

Points of interest
Section 1
 MRT Chiang Kai-shek Memorial Hall Station
 Zhongzheng District Office and Nanmen Market
 Central Bank
Section 2
 MRT Guting Station
 Guting Market
 Zhongzheng Junior High School & Nanchang Park
Section 3
 MRT Taipower Building Station
 TMI- Taiwan Mandarin Institute
 Taiwan Power Company Headquarters
 Taipei Cultural Mosque
Section 4
 MRT Gongguan Station
 National Taiwan University
 Gongguan Night Market
Section 5
 MRT Wanlong Station
 Wanfu Elementary School
Section 6
 MRT Jingmei Station
 Jingmei Night Market

See also
 List of roads in Taiwan

Streets in Taipei